The British Academy Television Craft Awards of 2002 are presented by the British Academy of Film and Television Arts (BAFTA) and were held on 12 May 2002 at the Savoy Hotel, Westminster, the ceremony was hosted by Harry Enfield.

Winners and nominees
Winners will be listed first and highlighted in boldface.

{| class="wikitable"
|-
! style="background:#BDB76B; width:50%" |  Best New Director - Fiction
! style="background:#BDB76B; width:50%" |  Best New Director - Factual
|-
| valign="top" |
 Tales from Pleasure Beach – Edmund Coulthard Teachers – Richard Dale
 Hearts and Bones – Brian Kirk
 Sweet Revenge – David Morrissey
| valign="top" |
 Witness: The Train – Donovan Wylie Alt TV: Lift – Marc Isaacs
 Me And My Dad – Penny Jagessar
 The Alcohol Years – Carol Morley
|-
|-
! style="background:#BDB76B; width:50%" |  Best New Writer 
! style="background:#BDB76B; width:50%" |  Best Original Television Music
|-
| valign="top" |
 Rob Dawber – The Navigators
 Daniel Brocklehurst – Clocking Off
 Richard Cottan – Men Only
 Rowan Joffe – Gas Attack
| valign="top" |
 The Blue Planet – George Fenton The Way We Live Now – Nicholas Hooper
 Perfect Strangers – Adrian Johnston
 The Lost World – Rob Lane
|-
|-
! style="background:#BDB76B; width:50%" |  Best Costume Design
! style="background:#BDB76B; width:50%" |  Best Production Design
|-
| valign="top" |
 The Life And Adventures Of Nicholas Nickleby – Barbara Kidd Othello – Les Lansdown
 Love in a Cold Climate – Mike O'Neill
 The Cazalets – Frances Tempest
| valign="top" |
 The Way We Live Now – Gerry Scott The Life And Adventures Of Nicholas Nickleby – James Merifield
 Love in a Cold Climate – Gerry Scott
 Othello – Malcolm Thornton
|-
|-
! style="background:#BDB76B; width:50%" |  Best Photography and Lighting - Fiction
! style="background:#BDB76B; width:50%" |  Best Photography - Factual
|-
| valign="top" |
 Othello – Daf Hobson Perfect Strangers – Cinders Forshaw
 Clocking Off – Peter Greenhalgh
 The Way We Live Now – Chris Seager
| valign="top" |
 The Blue Planet – Photography Team Fire, Plague, War And Treason: The Great Plague – Simon Bray
 Wild Africa – Photography Team
 Wildlife: Grizzly - Face To Face (Special) – Jeff Turner
|-
|-
! style="background:#BDB76B; width:50%" |  Best Editing - Fiction/Entertainment
! style="background:#BDB76B; width:50%" |  Best Editing - Factual
|-
| valign="top" |
 Othello – Nick Arthurs The Way We Live Now – Mark Day
 Clocking Off – Mark Elliott, Edward Mansell, Tony Cranstoun
 Perfect Strangers – Paul Tothill
| valign="top" |
 The Show Must Go On – Anna Ksiezopolska
 The Blue Planet – Jo Payne, Tim Coope, Alan Hoida, Martin Elsbury
 Kumbh Mela: The Greatest Show On Earth – Editing Team
 Joined: The World Of Siamese Twins – Paul Van Dyck
|-
|-
! style="background:#BDB76B; width:50%" |  Best Make-Up and Hair Design
! style="background:#BDB76B; width:50%" |  Best Visual Effects and Graphic Design
|-
| valign="top" |
 The Way We Live Now – Caroline Noble The Life And Adventures Of Nicholas Nickleby – Pamela Haddock
 Victoria & Albert – Pat Hay, Stephen Rose
 The Cazalets – Elaine Smith
| valign="top" |
 Banzai – Blue Source Building The Impossible: The Seven Wonders Of The Ancient World – Atlantic Digital
 The Lost World – William Bartlett, Virgil Manning, Darren Byford
 Walking with Beasts – Tim Greenwood, Max Tyrie, Jez Gibson-Harris, Mike Milne
|-
|-
! style="background:#BDB76B; width:50%" |  Best Sound - Entertainment
! style="background:#BDB76B; width:50%" |  Best Sound - Factual
|-
| valign="top" |
 Clocking Off – Sound Team Othello – Maurice Hillier, Colin Martin, Laura Lovejoy, Peter Bond
 The Lost World – Sound Team
 The Way We Live Now – Sound Team
| valign="top" |
 Hell in the Pacific – Peter Eason, Craig Butters, Cliff Jones Walking With Beasts – Kenny Clark, Jovan Ajder, Chris Burdon
 Walk On By: The Story Of Popular Song – Peter Davies, Paul Cowgill, Ravi Gurnam, Jane Barnett
 The Blue Planet – Sound Team
|-
|-
|}

Special awards
 BBC Natural History Edward Mansell'''

See also
 2002 British Academy Television Awards

References

External links
British Academy Craft Awards official website

2002 television awards
2002 in British television
2002 in British cinema
2002 in London
May 2002 events in the United Kingdom
2002